The  Miss South Carolina USA competition, previously known as Miss South Carolina Universe, is the pageant that selects the representative for the state South Carolina in the Miss USA pageant, and the name of the title held by that winner.  The pageant has been produced by Paula Miles, the sister of Miss South Carolina USA 1979, Janice McDonald, since 1980, and it has been directed by RPM Productions.

Miriam Stevenson, South Carolina's first Miss USA and the United States' first Miss Universe, was also the first Miss USA winner to have competed at Miss America.  She was the first woman to have competed at Miss America, Miss USA, and Miss Universe.  South Carolina's second Miss USA was Shawn Weatherly, who also went on to win Miss Universe.

Seven Miss South Carolina USAs have also held the Miss South Carolina Teen USA title and competed at Miss Teen USA.  Two have also competed at Miss America.

Miss South Carolina USA titleholders have also competed at two other major international pageants. Gina Tolleson, first runner-up at Miss USA 1990, went on to win the Miss World crown that year, and Miss South Carolina USA 2004, Amanda Pennekamp, has also competed at the Miss Earth 2006 pageant where she made the top 16.

Kirby Elizabeth Self of Greenwood was crowned Miss South Carolina USA 2023 on March 4, 2023 at North Charleston Coliseum & Performing Arts Center in North Charleston. She will represent South Carolina for the title of Miss USA 2023.

Gallery of titleholders

Results summary
Miss USAs: Miriam Stevenson (1954), Shawn Weatherly (1980), Lu Parker (1994)
1st runners-up: Mary Kemp Griffin (1953), Betty Cherry (1956), Vickie Chesser (1970), Gina Tolleson (1990), Amanda Pennekamp (2004)
2nd runners-up: Eva Engle (1969), Allison Grisso (1983), Audra Wallace (1992)
3rd runner-up: Virginia Murray (1976)
5th runner-up: Megan Pinckney (2013)
Top 5/8: Lauren Poppell (1999), Courtney Turner (2011), Megan Gordon (2017), Marley Stokes (2021)
Top 10/12: Susan Gordon (1972), Maribeth Curry (1986), April Abel (1988), Kelli Gosnell (1993), Lisa Rabon (2000), Ashley Williams (2002), Anna Hanks (2003), Lacie Lybrand (2006), Stephanie Murray Smith (2009), Christina Zapolski (2014)
Top 15/16/19: Susan Anthony Day (1953), Sara Stone (1955), Jean Spotts (1957), Patricia Ann Moss (1958), Cecelia Yoder (1963), Vicki Harrison (1965), Ashley Zais (2007), Jamie Hill (2008), Erika Powell (2012), Leah Lawson  (2016)

South Carolina holds a record of 37 placements at Miss USA.

Awards
Miss Congeniality: Kiki Kirkland (1973)
Miss Photogenic: Sonja Glenn (1998)
Best State Costume: Vicki Chesser (1970), Virginia Murray (1976)
Best in Swimsuit: Lauren Poppell (1999)

Winners 

Color key

References

External links
 Official website

South Carolina
South Carolina culture
Recurring events established in 1952
1952 establishments in South Carolina
Annual events in South Carolina